Hua Guofeng (born Su Zhu; 16 February 1921 – 20 August 2008), alternatively spelled as Hua Kuo-feng, was a Chinese politician who served as Chairman of the Chinese Communist Party and Premier of the People's Republic of China. The designated successor of Mao Zedong, Hua held the top offices of the government, party, and the military after the deaths of Mao and Premier Zhou Enlai, but was gradually forced out of supreme power by a coalition of party leaders between December 1978 and June 1981, and subsequently retreated from the political limelight, though still remaining a member of the Central Committee until 2002.

Born and raised in Jiaocheng, Shanxi, Hua was educated at the Jiaocheng County Commercial School and joined the Chinese Communist Party (CCP) in 1938, seeing action in both the Second Sino–Japanese War and the Chinese Civil War as a guerrilla fighter. In 1948, as the Communists gained the upper hand in the civil war, Hua was one among 50,000 party officials transferred from North to South China to take control of newly conquered territories and was assigned to Hunan, becoming Party Secretary of Xiangtan, which included Mao's birthplace of Shaoshan. A popular local administrator, Hua rose to become Party Secretary of Hunan during the Cultural Revolution, and was elevated to the national stage in the early 1970s, notably assuming control of the Ministry of Public Security in October 1973. Hua was appointed as Vice Premier in January 1975. After the death of Zhou Enlai, Mao elevated Hua to the position of Chinese Premier, overseeing government work, and of First Vice Chairman of the Communist Party, which made him Mao's designated successor.

On 6 October 1976, shortly after the death of Mao on 9 September, Hua removed the Gang of Four from political power by arranging for their arrests in Zhongnanhai, with the assistance of Mao's loyal security chief Wang Dongxing, who became one of Hua's strongest supporters, along with Vice Premier and chief economic planner Li Xiannian and Luo Qingchang, head of the intelligence services. Afterwards Hua took on the titles of Party Chairman and Chairman of the Central Military Commission, being thus far the only leader to have simultaneously held the offices of party leader, premier and CMC chairman.

Hua reversed some of the Cultural Revolution-era policies, such as the constant ideological campaigns, but he was fully devoted to a centrally planned economy and the continuation of the Maoist line. Between December 1978 and June 1981, a group of party veterans led by Deng Xiaoping, forced Hua from his position of paramount leader but allowed him to retain some titles. Hua gradually faded into political obscurity, but continued to insist on the correctness of Maoist principles.

Early life

Born in Jiaocheng, Shanxi, the fourth son of a family originally from Fan County, Henan, Hua lost his father at the age of seven. He studied at the Jiaocheng County Commercial School and joined the CCP in 1938, during the Second Sino–Japanese War. Like many Communists of the era who took on revolutionary names, he changed his name to Huá Guófēng as an abbreviation of "". After having served as a soldier in the 8th Route Army for 12 years under the command of Marshal Zhu De, he was appointed propaganda chief for the Jiaocheng County Party Committee in 1947, during the Chinese Civil War.

Hua moved with the victorious PLA to Hunan in 1948, where he married Han Zhijun, and would remain in that province until 1971. He was appointed Party Secretary for Xiangyin County in August 1949, just before the establishment of the People's Republic of China in October of that year. In 1952, he was appointed secretary of Xiangtan Special District, which included Mao's hometown, Shaoshan. In this role, he built a memorial hall dedicated to Mao. When Mao visited the site, in June 1959, he was favorably impressed. Mao Zedong first met Hua in 1955, and Mao was apparently favourably impressed by his simplicity.

Because the Governor of Hunan, General Cheng Qian, was not a communist (he belonged to the Revolutionary Committee of the Chinese Kuomintang, a left-wing nationalist faction of the KMT that collaborated with the CCP), Hua gradually came to exercise more and more power within the province, being named Vice Governor in 1958. 

Hua participated in the 1959 Lushan Conference (an enlarged plenary session of the CCP Central Committee) as a member of the Hunan Provincial Party delegation, and wrote two investigative reports fully defending all of Mao's policies. Hua's influence increased with the Cultural Revolution, as he supported it and led the movement in Hunan. He organized the preparation for the establishment of the local Revolutionary Committee in 1967, of which he was a Deputy Chairman. In December 1970, he was elected Chairman of the Revolutionary Committee as well as First Secretary of the CCP Hunan Committee.

He was elected a full member of the 9th Central Committee in 1969.

At the center of power

Hua was called to Beijing to direct Zhou Enlai's State Council staff office in 1971, but only stayed for a few months before returning to his previous post in Hunan. Later that year, he was appointed as the most junior of the seven-member committee investigating the Lin Biao Affair, a sign of the strong trust Mao had in him. Hua was re-elected as a full member of the 10th Central Committee in 1973 and elevated to membership in the Politburo; in the same year, he was put in charge of agricultural development by Zhou Enlai. 

In 1973, Mao named Hua Minister of Public Security and Vice Premier, thus giving him control of police and security forces. Hua's rising influence was confirmed by his being chosen to deliver a speech on modernizing agriculture in October of that year, which echoed the views of Zhou Enlai.

Zhou Enlai died on 8 January 1976, at a time when Deng Xiaoping's reformist alliance was not yet strong enough to stand up to both the ailing Mao Zedong and his Cultural Revolution allies, the Gang of Four (Jiang Qing, Zhang Chunqiao, Wang Hongwen, and Yao Wenyuan). A week after reading the late premier's eulogy, Deng left Beijing along with several close allies for the relative safety of Guangzhou.

Although Mao Zedong had reportedly wanted to appoint Zhang Chunqiao as Zhou Enlai's successor, he ended up naming Hua as acting Premier. At the same time, the media controlled by the Gang of Four began denouncing Deng once again (he had been purged during the Cultural Revolution, and was only returned to power in 1973). Popular affection for Zhou was underestimated, however, leading to the Tiananmen Incident, a confrontation between the radicals' militia allies and Beijing citizens seeking to honor Zhou during the traditional Qingming festival. At the same time, Hua delivered speeches on the "official line for criticizing Deng Xiaoping", which were approved by Mao and the Party Central Committee.

During the Tiananmen Incident of 1976, thousands of people protested at the militia's removal of wreaths honoring Zhou in front of the Monument to the People's Heroes. Vehicles were burned, offices ransacked and there were reports of many injuries and deaths. In the aftermath, Deng Xiaoping was blamed for inciting the protests and stripped of all his party and government posts, though his party membership was retained at Mao's behest. Shortly thereafter, Hua was elevated to First Vice Chairman of the CCP Central Committee and Premier of the State Council.

Following the Tangshan Earthquake in July, Hua visited the devastated area and helped direct relief efforts.

Removing the Gang of Four
Mao died on 9 September 1976 and Hua, as both the number two-man of the CCP and Premier, led the national commemorations in Beijing in his honor in the days that followed, and was the keynote speaker during the national memorial observance in the capital's Tiananmen Square. At the time, the highest power organ of the country, the Politburo Standing Committee, consisted of Hua, Ye Jianying, Zhang Chunqiao, and Wang Hongwen; Ye was in semi-retirement, and Zhang and Wang were part of the Gang of Four. Hua knew that in the post-Mao power vacuum, his position vis-a-vis the Gang of Four's would be a zero-sum game. That is, if the Gang of Four were not removed through use of force, the Gang might attempt to oust him pre-emptively. Hua made contact with Ye days after Mao's death to discuss plans about the Gang of Four. Ye had grown disillusioned with the Gang before Mao's death, so he and Hua came to a quick agreement to act  against the Gang. 

Hua crucially enjoyed the support of Mao's loyal security chief, Wang Dongxing, who had command of the elite 8341 Special Regiment, as well as other leading figures on the Politburo, including Vice Premier Li Xiannian and General Chen Xilian, Commander of the Beijing Military Region, as well as Luo Qingchang, chief of the intelligence services.  The group discussed ways to remove the Gang, including holding a Politburo or Central Committee meeting to oust them through established party procedure, but the idea was shot down because the Central Committee was, at the time, composed of many of the Gang's supporters. Eventually, the group decided to use force.

The members of the Gang were arrested on 6 October, soon after midnight. Hua had summoned Zhang Chunqiao, Wang Hongwen, and Yao Wenyuan to a meeting at Zhongnanhai, ostensibly to discuss the fifth volume of Mao's "Selected Works". They were arrested while walking into the meeting at Huairen Hall. According to Hua's own recollection of events, he and Marshal Ye Jianying were the only two leaders present at the "meeting", awaiting the arrival of the members of the Gang. Upon the arrest of each of the three, Hua personally announced to them the reasons for their detention. Hua said that they had engaged in "anti-party and anti-socialist" acts and "conspired to usurp power". Jiang Qing and Mao Yuanxin were arrested at their respective residences. A task force led by Geng Biao occupied the headquarters of the party's main propaganda organs, which were considered a part of the Gang's turf at the time.  Another group was dispatched to stabilize Shanghai, the Gang's main regional power base. At a Politburo meeting the next day, Hua Guofeng assumed the posts of Chairman of the CCP Central Committee and the Central Military Commission while in concurrent capacity as Premier of the State Council, becoming thus commander in chief of the People's Liberation Army.

Party Chairman and Premier

During his relatively short period in power, from October 1976 to December 1978, Hua quickly ousted the Gang of Four from political power and thus became the leader whose emergence marked the end of the Cultural Revolution. Following the incarceration of the Gang of Four and the establishment of the new ruling triumvirate (Hua Guofeng, Marshal Ye Jianying, and chief economic planner Li Xiannian) began the restoration to power of Deng Xiaoping and the elimination of Gang influence throughout the political system. Hua's economic and political programs involved the restoration of Soviet-style industrial planning and party control similar to that followed by China before the Great Leap Forward. However, this model was rejected by supporters of Deng Xiaoping, who argued for a more private-based economic system. 

This struggle was decisively resolved in Deng's favor in December 1978, which is generally taken as the start of the era of Chinese economic reform. Hua also attempted reforming state protocol as a method of elevating his prestige. In 1978 all party meetings were to hang portraits of Mao and Hua side-by-side, including at the National People's Congress and CCP Party Congress meetings. All schools were required to hang Hua's picture next to Mao's. Hua also changed the Chinese national anthem to incorporate Mao Zedong and the Chinese Communist Party, switching the tone from being war-rallying to purely Communist ideology. These lyrics were eventually rejected. Hua Guofeng continued to use the terminology of the Cultural Revolution, but he criticized certain aspects of it, including the education reform, the revolutionary committees' activity and other excesses, blaming the Gang of Four. State media referred to him as "the wise leader".

In February 1978, the party met to approve a new state constitution, which Hua was heavily involved in drafting. This document, which attempted to restore some rule of law and planning mechanisms from the PRC's original 1956 constitution, still contained references to continuous revolution and proletarian internationalism; it was replaced only four years later with a different constitution. Hua and other party left-wingers such as Li Xiannian also drafted an ambitious ten-year economic plan which sought to create a Soviet-style economy based around heavy industry and energy, but it was quickly scrapped in favor of a cheaper and more doable five-year plan which prioritized light industry and consumer goods.

In October 1979, Hua went on a European tour, the first of its kind for a Chinese leader after 1949. He traveled to West Germany and France. On 28 October Hua visited the United Kingdom and met with British Prime Minister Margaret Thatcher. The two engaged in friendly talks and discussed the future of Hong Kong, which was a British Overseas Territory at the time.

Chairman Hua visited Derby's British Rail Railway Technical Centre to observe the development of the Advanced Passenger Train. His visit coincided with the donation of the Chinese Government Railways Steam Locomotive 4-8-4 KF Class No 7 to the National Railway Museum in York. Chairman Hua also went to a farm in Oxfordshire and visited Oxford University.

Hua was one of the last foreigners to visit Mohammad Reza Pahlavi, the Shah of Iran, before he was overthrown in 1979.

At the CCP 3rd Plenary Session of the 11th Central Committee, after which Deng Xiaoping became the de facto leader of China as his idea for economic reform was adopted by the Party, Hua Guofeng was implicitly criticized for serving concurrently as Chairman of the Central Committee, Chairman of the Central Military Commission and Premier of the State Council. This was reverted between 1980 and 1981, as the three posts were assigned to three people, but this system was re-established by Jiang Zemin as he became "paramount leader" of China (serving however as General Secretary rather than Party Chairman).

Ousting and death

As Deng Xiaoping gradually gained control of the CCP, Hua was denounced for promoting the Two Whatevers policy. As early as January 1979, state media had stopped referring to him as "the wise leader" and he was replaced as Premier by Zhao Ziyang in 1980, was replaced as Party Chairman by Hu Yaobang and was replaced as chairman of the Central Military Commission by Deng himself in 1981. Hua gave self-criticism sessions and he eventually renounced the Two Whatevers policy as a mistake. Both Zhao and Hu were protégés of Deng who were dedicated to Chinese economic reform. Hua Guofeng was demoted to the position of junior Vice Chairman; and when this post was abolished in 1982, he continued to serve as an ordinary member of the Central Committee, a position which he held until the 16th Party Congress of November 2002, despite having passed the mandatory retirement age of 70 in 1991.

After Hua's downfall in 1980–81, the party's official verdict was that he had done good work by removing the Gang of Four, but afterwards, he committed "serious errors".

The ousting of Hua was significant in at least two respects. First, it demonstrated the unimportance of official titles in the Chinese Communist Party during the late 1970s and early 1980s. Despite being the official leader of the party, the state, and the army, Hua was unable to defeat a leadership challenge by Deng Xiaoping. Secondly, Hua's ousting reflected a change of policies which were initiated by Deng Xiaoping according to which disgraced party members would merely be stripped of their positions, they would not be jailed or physically harmed.

After 16th Party Congress in November 2002, Hua officially lost his seat on the Central Committee of the CCP. It was reported that he voluntarily retired for age and health reasons, but the party did not officially confirm this. He was, however, invited to the 17th Party Congress in 2007 as a special delegate and he appeared at a ceremony which was held in December 2007 in order to commemorate the 115th anniversary of Mao Zedong's birth.

Despite his retention of formal party positions, Hua distanced himself from active participation in politics. His main hobby was grape cultivation, and he kept up with current affairs by subscribing to a host of newspapers. Hua's health deteriorated in 2008, and he was hospitalized for kidney and heart complications. He died in Beijing on 20 August 2008. A cause of death was not given, and because his death occurred during the festive Beijing Olympics, it was not given much attention by state media: merely a 30-second broadcast on the national news program Xinwen Lianbo and a short paragraph on the corner of the front page of the People's Daily. 

His funeral, which was held at the Babaoshan Revolutionary Cemetery on 30 August, was attended by the all members of the Politburo Standing Committee, as well as former President Jiang Zemin and former Premier Zhu Rongji.

Legacy 
Hua's legacy is often reduced to the Two Whatevers: "uphold whatever policy decisions Chairman Mao made, and unswervingly follow whatever instructions Chairman Mao gave."

Economic historian Isabella Weber argues that the Hua's upholding of the Two Whatevers policy is an overemphasized aspect of Hua's legacy. Weber argues that "Paying tribute to Mao in the year after his passing was hardly unique to Hua" and that the Two Whatevers slogan was also upheld by Chen Yun, who along with Deng Xiaoping superseded Hua. 

Hua's break with Cultural Revolution era economic policies were consistent with the 1975 reform agenda of Deng.  Hua made national economic development a matter of the highest priority and emphasized the need to achieve "liberation of productive forces." He "combined  Soviet-style big push industrialization with an opening up to the capitalist world" and under his leadership, China opened its first Special Economic Zone and launched major efforts to attract foreign direct investment. Hua's encouraged a local economy policy that included both planned elements and limited market freedom of the sort that Mao had previously derided as economism.

Hua removed the controls that the Gang of Four had established over cultural and educational policy. The relaxation of controls over cultural content resulted in a transition from revolutionary art to more individualist and market-oriented works like scar literature. Hua regained the loyalty of party cadre and intellectuals, who had generally been marginalized during the Cultural Revolution. This strengthened the party apparatus and contributed to national stability.

Family
Hua married Han Zhijun in January 1949. They had four children, all of whom are surnamed "Su", in accordance with Hua's birth name. Their first son, Su Hua, is a retired Air Force officer. Their second son, Su Bin, is a retired army officer. Their older daughter, Su Ling, is a party and union official at the Civil Aviation Administration of China. Their younger daughter, Su Li, works for the State Council.

See also

 Politics of the People's Republic of China
 History of the People's Republic of China (1976–89)
 History of Communist Party of China

References

External links
Official biography of Hua Guofeng (in Chinese), Xinhua News Agency 31 August 2008
Hua Guofeng Archive at the Marxist Internet Archive.

|-
|colspan="3" style="text-align:center;"|Chinese Communist Party
|-

|-
|colspan="3" style="text-align:center;"|People's Republic of China
|-

Premiers of the People's Republic of China
1921 births
2008 deaths
People of the Cultural Revolution
Chinese Communist Party politicians from Shanxi
Governors of Hunan
Politicians from Lüliang
People's Republic of China politicians from Shanxi
Ministers of Public Security of the People's Republic of China
20th-century Chinese heads of government
General Secretaries and Chairmen of the Chinese Communist Party
Members of the 11th Politburo Standing Committee of the Chinese Communist Party
Members of the 10th Politburo Standing Committee of the Chinese Communist Party
Chinese Marxists